Thunder Force is a 2021 American superhero comedy film written and directed by Ben Falcone, and starring Melissa McCarthy, Octavia Spencer, Bobby Cannavale, Pom Klementieff, Taylor Mosby, with Melissa Leo, and Jason Bateman. It is the fifth collaboration between McCarthy and her husband Falcone, and follows two childhood friends who invent a way to become superheroes in a world where criminals have developed superpowers.

The film was digitally released by Netflix on April 9, 2021. It received generally negative reviews from critics.

Plot

In March 1983, Earth was subjected to cosmic rays that gave sociopaths superpowers, resulting in a rise of supervillains known as Miscreants. With no one able to stop the Miscreants, normal people are usually left living in fear of being attacked by them. After a Miscreant kills her geneticist parents on their way home from work, Emily Stanton becomes determined to find a way to stop Miscreants.

By 1985, Emily has sacrificed much of her social life in favor of researching possible methods of fighting back against Miscreants. While this results in her being bullied, Lydia Berman stands up for her and becomes her best and only friend. Lydia supports Emily's dream of giving superpowers to normal people, though she tries to make sure that Emily does not overwork herself. When Lydia convinces Emily to take a half-hour nap from studying in 1993, she accidentally causes Emily to oversleep and wake up late for an AP exam, straining their relationship and causing them to drift apart.

In 2024, Emily and Lydia have gone their separate ways, with Emily becoming a successful scientist and researcher for her own company and Lydia becoming a longshoreman. Lydia tries to reconnect with Emily when their high school reunion comes around and invites her to come. When she fails to show up on the night of the reunion, Lydia concludes that Emily is still uncomfortable attending parties by herself and goes to pick her up. Emily tells her that while she would have liked to go to the reunion, she had forgotten when the reunion was and had a project she had to work on that night, which Emily wants to show to Lydia. Unfortunately, Lydia accidentally injects herself with a serum Emily had been working on.

Having been injected with the serum, Lydia learns from Emily that the serum was designed to give a normal person superhuman strength and that she would have to undergo special training and treatment so the serum does not kill her. Emily also joins Lydia in the treatment, although a less painful one since Emily took the serum in a pill form to take the other superpower concocted, invisibility. During the thirty-three day treatment and training, Lydia and Emily grow closer. Lydia discovers that in the years since their high school graduation, Emily had a daughter, Tracy, with one of the researchers, who could not handle the responsibility and left them.

Once they finish their training and treatment, Emily and Lydia foil a liquor store robbery run by a Miscreant with crab arms known as the Crab, who falls in love with an equally smitten Lydia, much to Emily's concern. Emily and Lydia, known as the superhero team Thunder Force, are praised for their heroics. This brings Thunder Force to the attention of mayoral candidate William "The King" Stevens, whose campaign is built on the idea that only he can end the Miscreants' crimes.

With the help of Laser, a Miscreant who can generate and control whip-like energy beams, the King tries to get Thunder Force to work for him, leaving Chicago at the mercy of the Miscreants unless he wins the mayoral election. Thunder Force continues to fight crime with their superpowers and support the rival mayoral candidate, thereby causing the King to lose the election. The King then sends Laser to attack Thunder Force when they're at a diner. When she tries to get away, Lydia throws a bus at her despite Emily's protests. Though nobody was hurt, Emily decides that Lydia's impulsiveness is more problematic than beneficial, once again straining their friendship.

In an effort to make amends, Lydia goes on a date with the Crab to get some useful information. Along with how the Crab is a misunderstood person who had to turn to a life of crime, Lydia learns that the King is planning on blowing up everyone who did not vote for him in the election, along with the new mayor, at a party he's hosting under the guise of a celebration of the new mayor. She tells Emily of what she learned and makes amends with her.

After fighting off Laser one last time, Thunder Force go to stop the King from bombing the building. When they manage to find the bomb, the King decides to fight Thunder Force himself, revealing himself to be a Miscreant with superhuman strength, though significantly stronger than Lydia. Before the King can kill Lydia, the Crab double crosses the King and gets his claws broken off. Tracy also joins the fight, having injected herself with her mother's serum, giving her the ability to run at superhuman speed. Though they manage to take the King down, Thunder Force realizes that the bomb will go off before they can disarm it.

With no guarantee that the bomb would be stable enough to not go off while Tracy carries the bomb to somewhere safe, Lydia decides to sacrifice herself, knowing that she can at least reduce the impact of the explosion. She jumps out the building with the bomb and dives into the Chicago River, seemingly dying in the explosion. However, the paramedics manage to find her body and resuscitate her. Thunder Force, now with a stronger friendship between Emily and Lydia, are offered by the mayor the assistance of the city's resources, which they accept.

Cast
 Melissa McCarthy as Lydia Berman / The Hammer 
 Mia Kaplan as teen Lydia Berman
 Vivian Falcone as young Lydia Berman
 Octavia Spencer as Emily Stanton / Bingo
 Tai Leshaun as teen Emily Stanton
 Bria Danielle as young Emily Stanton
 Jason Bateman as Jerry / The Crab
 Bobby Cannavale as William Stevens / The King
 Pom Klementieff as Laser
 Melissa Leo as Allie
 Taylor Mosby as Tracy
 Marcella Lowery as Grandma Norma
 Melissa Ponzio as Rachel Gonzales
 Ben Falcone as Kenny
 Kevin Dunn as Frank
 Tyrel Jackson Williams as Jessie
 Sarah Baker as B. Krut
 David Storrs as Andrew
 Brendan Jennings as Clyde
 Jackson Dippel as Young Wayne

Production 
On March 29, 2019, it was reported that Netflix had greenlit a superhero comedy film entitled Thunder Force to be written and directed by Ben Falcone, with Melissa McCarthy and Octavia Spencer as lead roles.

Principal photography began September 25, 2019 in Atlanta, Georgia and wrapped on December 10, 2019.

In lieu of eating raw chicken on-screen, which McCarthy's character is required to do to maintain her super strength, the cast ate "really thinly sliced pears treated with citric acid and food coloring."

Reception

Audience viewership 
In its first 28 days of release, Thunder Force was watched by approximately 52 million viewers worldwide.

Critical response
On Rotten Tomatoes, the film has an approval rating of 22% based on 141 reviews and an average rating of 4.10/10. The critics consensus reads: "It's got a few chuckles, but Thunder Force is largely a superhero comedy that's neither exciting nor funny -- and an egregious waste of its co-stars' talents." On Metacritic, the film has a score of 34 out of 100 based on 34 critic reviews, meaning "generally unfavorable reviews".

Richard Roeper of the Chicago Sun-Times gave the film 1.5 out of 4 stars, writing: "It's always a shame when a group of talented humans get together and deliver something that comes across as a halfhearted effort, even if they poured their blood, sweat and tears into it." Kate Erbland of IndieWire gave the film a "C" and wrote: "While McCarthy and Spencer do their damndest to make the family-friendly feature work — McCarthy in particular brings real texture to her charming slacker with a heart of gold, a role she's played so many times before — Thunder Force isn't clever enough to break new ground in the superhero milieu, nor is it silly enough to mine its material for the kind of jokes that would make it distinctive."

References

External links 
 

2020s superhero comedy films
2021 comedy films
2021 films
American science fiction comedy films
American superhero films
2020s science fiction comedy films
2020s English-language films
Films directed by Ben Falcone
Films produced by Ben Falcone
Films produced by Marc E. Platt
Films produced by Melissa McCarthy
Films set in Chicago
Films shot in Atlanta
Films with screenplays by Ben Falcone
Superheroine films
2020s American films